Edward or Edi Ziegler may refer to:

Edward Danner Ziegler (1844–1931), American local official and Democratic legislator
Edward Ziegler (music journalist) (1870–1947), American writer and opera manager
Edi Ziegler (born 1930), German road racing cyclist

See also
Ziegler (surname)